The Pearson distribution is a family of continuous probability distributions. It was first published by Karl Pearson in 1895 and subsequently extended by him in 1901 and 1916 in a series of articles on biostatistics.

History 
The Pearson system was originally devised in an effort to model visibly skewed observations. It was well known at the time how to adjust a theoretical model to fit the first two cumulants or moments of observed data: Any probability distribution can be extended straightforwardly to form a location-scale family. Except in pathological cases, a location-scale family can be made to fit the observed mean (first cumulant) and variance (second cumulant) arbitrarily well. However, it was not known how to construct probability distributions in which the skewness (standardized third cumulant) and kurtosis (standardized fourth cumulant) could be adjusted equally freely. This need became apparent when trying to fit known theoretical models to observed data that exhibited skewness. Pearson's examples include survival data, which are usually asymmetric.

In his original paper, Pearson (1895, p. 360) identified four types of distributions (numbered I through IV) in addition to the normal distribution (which was originally known as type V). The classification depended on whether the distributions were supported on a bounded interval, on a half-line, or on the whole real line; and whether they were potentially skewed or necessarily symmetric. A second paper (Pearson 1901) fixed two omissions: it redefined the type V distribution (originally just the normal distribution, but now the inverse-gamma distribution) and introduced the type VI distribution. Together the first two papers cover the five main types of the Pearson system (I, III, IV, V, and VI). In a third paper, Pearson (1916) introduced further special cases and subtypes (VII through XII).

Rhind (1909, pp. 430–432) devised a simple way of visualizing the parameter space of the Pearson system, which was subsequently adopted by Pearson (1916, plate 1 and pp. 430ff., 448ff.). The Pearson types are characterized by two quantities, commonly referred to as β1 and β2. The first is the square of the skewness:  where γ1 is the skewness, or third standardized moment. The second is the traditional kurtosis, or fourth standardized moment: β2 = γ2 + 3. (Modern treatments define kurtosis γ2 in terms of cumulants instead of moments, so that for a normal distribution we have γ2 = 0 and β2 = 3. Here we follow the historical precedent and use β2.) The diagram on the right shows which Pearson type a given concrete distribution (identified by a point (β1, β2)) belongs to.

Many of the skewed and/or non-mesokurtic distributions familiar to us today were still unknown in the early 1890s. What is now known as the beta distribution had been used by Thomas Bayes as a posterior distribution of the parameter of a Bernoulli distribution in his 1763 work on inverse probability. The Beta distribution gained prominence due to its membership in Pearson's system and was known until the 1940s as the Pearson type I distribution. (Pearson's type II distribution is a special case of type I, but is usually no longer singled out.) The gamma distribution originated from Pearson's work (Pearson 1893, p. 331; Pearson 1895, pp. 357, 360, 373–376) and was known as the Pearson type III distribution, before acquiring its modern name in the 1930s and 1940s. Pearson's 1895 paper introduced the type IV distribution, which contains Student's t-distribution as a special case, predating William Sealy Gosset's subsequent use by several years. His 1901 paper introduced the inverse-gamma distribution (type V) and the beta prime distribution (type VI).

Definition 
A Pearson density p is defined to be any valid solution to the differential equation (cf. Pearson 1895, p. 381)

with:

According to Ord, Pearson devised the underlying form of Equation (1) on the basis of, firstly, the formula for the derivative of the logarithm of the density function of the normal distribution (which gives a linear function) and, secondly, from a recurrence relation for values in the probability mass function of the hypergeometric distribution (which yields the linear-divided-by-quadratic structure).

In Equation (1), the parameter a determines a stationary point, and hence under some conditions a mode of the distribution, since

follows directly from the differential equation.

Since we are confronted with a first-order linear differential equation with variable coefficients, its solution is straightforward:

The integral in this solution simplifies considerably when certain special cases of the integrand are considered. Pearson (1895, p. 367) distinguished two main cases, determined by the sign of the discriminant (and hence the number of real roots) of the quadratic function

Particular types of distribution

Case 1, negative discriminant

The Pearson type IV distribution 
If the discriminant of the quadratic function (2) is negative, it has no real roots. Then define

Applying these substitutions, the quadratic function (2) is transformed into

The absence of real roots is obvious from this formulation, because α2 is necessarily positive.

We now express the solution to the differential equation (1) as a function of y:

Pearson (1895, p. 362) called this the "trigonometrical case", because the integral

involves the inverse trigonometric arctan function.  Then

Finally, let

Applying these substitutions, we obtain the parametric function:

This unnormalized density has support on the entire real line. It depends on a scale parameter α > 0 and shape parameters m > 1/2 and ν. One parameter was lost when we chose to find the solution to the differential equation (1) as a function of y rather than x. We therefore reintroduce a fourth parameter, namely the location parameter λ. We have thus derived the density of the Pearson type IV distribution:

The normalizing constant involves the complex Gamma function (Γ) and the Beta function (B).
Notice that the location parameter λ here is not the same as the original location parameter introduced in the general formulation, but is related via

The Pearson type VII distribution 

The shape parameter ν of the Pearson type IV distribution controls its skewness. If we fix its value at zero, we obtain a symmetric three-parameter family. This special case is known as the Pearson type VII distribution (cf. Pearson 1916, p. 450). Its density is

where B is the Beta function.

An alternative parameterization (and slight specialization) of the type VII distribution is obtained by letting

which requires m > 3/2. This entails a minor loss of generality but ensures that the variance of the distribution exists and is equal to σ2.  Now the parameter m only controls the kurtosis of the distribution. If m approaches infinity as λ and σ are held constant, the normal distribution arises as a special case:

This is the density of a normal distribution with mean λ and standard deviation σ.

It is convenient to require that m > 5/2 and to let

This is another specialization, and it guarantees that the first four moments of the distribution exist. More specifically, the Pearson type VII distribution parameterized in terms of (λ, σ, γ2) has a mean of λ, standard deviation of σ, skewness of zero, and positive excess kurtosis of γ2.

Student's t-distribution 
The Pearson type VII distribution is equivalent to the non-standardized Student's t-distribution with parameters ν > 0, μ, σ2 by applying the following substitutions to its original parameterization:

Observe that the constraint  is satisfied.

The resulting density is

which is easily recognized as the density of a Student's t-distribution.

This implies that the Pearson type VII distribution subsumes the standard Student's t-distribution and also the standard Cauchy distribution. In particular, the standard Student's t-distribution arises as a subcase, when μ = 0 and σ2 = 1, equivalent to the following substitutions:

The density of this restricted one-parameter family is a standard Student's t:

Case 2, non-negative discriminant 
If the quadratic function (2) has a non-negative discriminant, it has real roots a1 and a2 (not necessarily distinct):

In the presence of real roots the quadratic function (2) can be written as

and the solution to the differential equation is therefore

Pearson (1895, p. 362) called this the "logarithmic case", because the integral

involves only the logarithm function and not the arctan function as in the previous case.

Using the substitution

we obtain the following solution to the differential equation (1):

Since this density is only known up to a hidden constant of proportionality, that constant can be changed and the density written as follows:

The Pearson type I distribution 
The Pearson type I distribution (a generalization of the beta distribution) arises when the roots of the quadratic equation (2) are of opposite sign, that is, . Then the solution p is supported on the interval . Apply the substitution

where , which yields a solution in terms of y that is supported on the interval (0, 1):

One may define:

Regrouping constants and parameters, this simplifies to:

It turns out that m1, m2 > −1 is necessary and sufficient for p to be a proper probability density function.

The Pearson type II distribution 
The Pearson type II distribution is a special case of the Pearson type I family restricted to symmetric distributions.

For the Pearson Type II Curve,

where

The Pearson Type II Curve is used in computing the table of significant correlation coefficients for Spearman's rank correlation coefficient when the number of items in a series is less than 100 (or 30, depending on some sources). After that, the distribution mimics a standard Student's t-distribution. For the table of values, certain values are used as the constants in the previous equation:

The moments of x used are

The Pearson type III distribution 
Defining

The Pearson type III distribution is a gamma distribution or chi-squared distribution.

The Pearson type V distribution 
Defining new parameters:

The Pearson type V distribution is an inverse-gamma distribution.

The Pearson type VI distribution 
Defining

The Pearson type VI distribution is a beta prime distribution or  F-distribution.

Relation to other distributions 
The Pearson family subsumes the following distributions, among others:
 Beta distribution (type I)
 Beta prime distribution (type VI)
 Cauchy distribution (type IV)
 Chi-squared distribution (type III)
 Continuous uniform distribution (limit of type I)
 Exponential distribution (type III)
 Gamma distribution (type III)
 F-distribution (type VI)
 Inverse-chi-squared distribution (type V)
 Inverse-gamma distribution (type V)
 Normal distribution (limit of type I, III, IV, V, or VI)
 Student's t-distribution (type VII, which is the non-skewed subtype of type IV)

Alternatives to the Pearson system of distributions for the purpose of fitting distributions to data are the quantile-parameterized distributions (QPDs) and the metalog distributions. QPDs and metalogs can provide greater shape and bounds flexibility than the Pearson system. Instead of fitting moments, QPDs are typically fit to empirical CDF or other data with linear least squares.

Applications 
These models are used in financial markets, given their ability to be parametrized in a way that has intuitive meaning for market traders. A number of models are in current use that capture the stochastic nature of the volatility of rates, stocks, etc., and this family of distributions may prove to be one of the more important.

In the United States, the Log-Pearson III is the default distribution for flood frequency analysis.

Recently, there have been alternatives developed to the Pearson distributions that are more flexible and easier to fit to data. See the metalog distributions.

Notes

Sources

Primary sources

Secondary sources 
 Milton Abramowitz and Irene A. Stegun (1964). Handbook of Mathematical Functions with Formulas, Graphs, and Mathematical Tables. National Bureau of Standards.
Eric W. Weisstein et al. Pearson Type III Distribution. From MathWorld.

References 
Elderton, Sir W.P, Johnson, N.L. (1969) Systems of Frequency Curves. Cambridge University Press.
Ord J.K. (1972) Families of Frequency Distributions. Griffin, London.

Continuous distributions
Systems of probability distributions